2005 in the Philippines details events of note that happened in the Philippines in the year 2005.

Incumbents

 President: Gloria Macapagal Arroyo (Lakas-CMD)
 Vice President: Noli de Castro (Independent) 
 Senate President: Franklin Drilon
 House Speaker: Jose de Venecia
 Chief Justice:
Hilario Davide (until December 19)
Artemio Panganiban (from December 20)
 Philippine Congress: 13th Congress of the Philippines

Events

February
 February 14 – Valentine's Day bombings happen in different cities in the country, killing nine and injuring over a hundred people.

March
March 14–15 – A day-long siege, hostage-taking, and jailbreak attempt, staged by three top leaders of Abu Sayyaf Group, commanders Robot, Global, and Kosovo, in a prison in Camp Bagong Diwa, Taguig City ends in an assault by the police, killing more than twenty people, mostly inmates, including the perpetrators.

June
 June 27 – President Gloria Macapagal Arroyo addresses the country in a television broadcast, admitting speaking to an election official, but denying manipulating election results.

October
 October 26 – An explosion occurs inside a gold mine tunnel and a landslide strikes on Mount Diwata in Compostela Valley killing at least 32 people, with five others missing and feared dead.

Holidays

On November 13, 2002, Republic Act No. 9177 declares Eidul Fitr as a regular holiday. The EDSA Revolution Anniversary was proclaimed since 2002 as a special non-working holiday.  Note that in the list, holidays in bold are "regular holidays" and those in italics are "nationwide special days".

 January 1 – New Year's Day
 February 25 – EDSA Revolution Anniversary
 March 24 – Maundy Thursday
 March 25 – Good Friday
 April 9 – Araw ng Kagitingan (Day of Valor)
 May 1 – Labor Day
 June 12 – Independence Day 
 August 21 – Ninoy Aquino Day
 August 28 – National Heroes Day
 November 1 –  All Saints Day
 November 3 – Eidul Fitr
 November 30 – Bonifacio Day
 December 25 – Christmas Day
 December 30 – Rizal Day
 December 31 – Last Day of the Year

In addition, several other places observe local holidays, such as the foundation of their town. These are also "special days."

Television

 September 26 – Lara Quigaman of the Philippines is crowned as Miss International 2005 in the pageant night was held in Koseinenkin Hall, Tokyo, Japan, and she became the fourth Filipina to win the pageant.

Sports
 January 30—PBA Commissioner Noli Eala Forfeits Game 1 of the Finals 71-89 While Talk 'n Text Phone Pals Leads 1-0 in Favor of Barangay Ginebra Kings Since Asi Taulava She is Suspended by the League and the Participating of Their Games
 March 20 -- Erik Morales Defeats Manny Pacquiao on is 12 Rounds Unanimous Decision Victory in MGM Grand Garden Arena in Las Vegas, Nevada United States
 July 10 -- San Miguel Beermen Wins the Fiesta Conference on this 2nd Season and 2nd Conference The Beermen Defeats Talk 'n Text Phone Pals in Game Five for a 4-1 Series Victory
 September 11 -- Manny Pacquiao Knockout Hector Velasquez in the 6th Round to Claim the New WBC International Super Featherweight Title While Zhair Raheem Defeats Erik Morales Via Unanimous Decision Victory in the 12 Round Lightweight Super-Fight + Brian Viloria Knockouts Eric Ortiz in the 1st Round to Claim the New WBC Jr. Flyweight Title + Rey Bautista Knockouts Felix Flores in the 3rd Round in Staples Center in Los Angeles, California
 November 27–December 5 – Philippines hosts the 2005 SEA Games.

Births
 February 15 – AJ Urquia, actor and host of Team Yey!
 February 23 – Jillian Ward, actress and commercial model
 March 18 – Marc Justine Alvarez, actor
 March 25 – Larah Claire Sabroso, actress
 May 23 – Alex Eala, tennis player
 June 2 – Bea Clark, actress
 June 12 – Ryzza Mae Dizon, actress
 July 18 – Milkcah Wynne Nacion, actress and vlogger
 September 7 – Kyle Danielle Ocampo, actress
 September 7 – Mitch Naco, host of Team Yey!
 September 9 – Mackie Empuerto 
 November 8 – Sofia Millares, actress and host of Team Yey!
 November 11 – Kryshee Grengia, actress
 December 12 – Alekhine Nouri, Filipino FIDE Master
 December 15 – Sheena Belarmino, singer and dancer

Deaths
 January 7 – Orly Punzalan, Filipino radio-TV personality (b. 1935)
 February 25 – Francis E. Garchitorena Filipino Sandiganbayan Presiding Judge (b. 1938)
 March 17 – Cecille "Dabiana" Iñigo, Filipina film actress and comedian (b. 1952)
 March 24 – Marlene Garcia-Esperat, Filipina whistleblower and investigative journalist, murder victim (b. 1959)
 March 31 – Justiniano Montano, Filipino politician (b. 1905)
 April 11 – Teodoro Borlongan, Filipino Banker (b. 1955)
 April 28 – Raymundo Punongbayan, former director of the Philippine Institute of Volcanology and Seismology (PHIVOLCS) (1983–2002) (b. 1937)
 May 4:
 Luis Taruc, Filipino political figure and insurgent (b. 1913)
 Klein Cantoneros, Radio Broadcaster (b. 1973)
 May 9 – Ang Kiukok, Filipino painter and a National Artist for Visual Arts (b. 1931)
 May 10:
 Romy Diaz, Filipino actor (b. 1941)
 Leon C. Arcillas, Filipino politician, Mayor of Sta. Rosa, Laguna (b. 1942)
 May 11 – Philip Agustin, editor and publisher (b. 1950)
 May 27 – Richard Tann, Filipino Singer, Member of Circus Band (b. 1954)
 June 3 – Teodoro Benigno, journalist, writer (b. 1923)
 June 8 – Luis Santiago, TV director (b. 1977)
 June 21 – Jaime Sin, Roman Catholic Archbshop of Manila (b. 1928)
 July 15 – Leonor Orosa-Goquingco, Filipino national artist (b. 1917)
 August 5 – Raul Roco, Former senator and Filipino presidential candidate, cancer (b. 1941)
 August 10 – Mar Amongo, Filipino comic book artist (b. 1936) 
 September 4 – Roseli Ocampo-Friedmann, Filipino-American microbiologist and botanist (b. 1937)
 September 13 – Haydee Yorac, Filipino public servant, law professor and politician (b. 1941)
 September 16 – Verna Gaston, Filipino actress (b. 1950)
 October 2 – Juancho Gutierrez, Filipino Actor (b. 1932)
 October 27 – Jun Papa, Olympic basketball player (b. 1945)
 November 18 – Freddie Quizon, Filipino actor, comedian, production coordinator (b. 1956)
 November 19 – Ricardo Uy, Radio Broadcaster (b. 1955)
 December 15 – Alfredo Lagmay, Filipino Psychologist (b. 1919)
 December 19 – Reynaldo Wycoco, Director of National Bureau of Investigation (b. 1946)
 December 25 – Robert Barbers, politician, Heart Attack (b. 1944)

Unknown
 Fred Carrillo, Filipino comic book artist. (b. 1926)

References

 
2005 in Southeast Asia
Philippines
2000s in the Philippines
Years of the 21st century in the Philippines